The Flying Dutchman World Championship, also known as FD Worlds, are international sailing regattas in the Flying Dutchman class organized by the International Flying Dutchman Class Organization since 1956 and recognised by  World Sailing.

The Szabolcs Majthényi & András Domokos team has been the most successful in the history of the championships, with fourteen titles, making Hungary the most successful among the nations. Danish sailors together have won thirteen championships as well, followed by sailors of West Germany with eight titles.

Flying Dutchman was an Olympic class from 1960 to 1992.

History
The first Flying Dutchman World Championships were held in Starnberger See in 1956.

Editions

All-time medal table

Medalists

Multiple medallists

See also
World Sailing
World championships in sailing

References

World championships in sailing
Recurring sporting events established in 1956
Flying Dutchman (dinghy)